Omeife is a female-looking humanoid robot being developed by the Uniccon Group of Companies programmed to speak Pidgin, Yoruba, English, French, Arabic, Kiswahili, Hausa, Igbo and Afrikaans and the first African humanoid robot. Omeife was first unveiled on 10 October 2022 at the GITEX technology event at the Dubai World Trade Centre, UAE.

Objectives and abilities 
Omeife robot was first conceptualized in 2020 and built as a female Igbo character that understands and speaks eight different languages by Uniccon Group of Companies. It is powered by artificial intelligence algorithms with deep understanding of African culture and behavioral patterns. She is a six-foot-tall female humanoid that is aimed to provide languages as a service for businesses that needs to integrate African audiences.

See also 

 Robonaut

References 

Humanoid space robots